Raghunath Sahai Puri was an Indian politician and a member of Indian National Congress. He was the Minister for Housing & Urban Development in Punjab Government during 2002-2007.

Early life

His father's name was Des Raj Puri.

Political career

He was elected to the Punjab Legislative Assembly in 1985 from Sujanpur. He was re-elected from Sujanpur in 1992 and 2002. In 2002 he was made a cabinet minister in Punjab and given portfolios of Housing & Urban Development. He had held portfolios of tourism and transport also.

Death
He died on 22 December 2007 in Chandigarh.

References

Punjab, India MLAs 2002–2007
1938 births
2007 deaths
People from Gurdaspur district
Punjab, India MLAs 1985–1990
Punjab, India MLAs 1992–1997
People from Pathankot district